Make You Mad may refer to:

"Make You Mad", song by Odds from Nest
"Make You Mad", song by Fifth Harmony from Fifth Harmony
"Make You Mad", song by Becca from Alive
"What've I Done (To Make You Mad)", song by Linda Jones